Lecanora cenisia is a species of crustose lichen in the family Lecanoraceae. It is a known host of the lichenicolous fungus species Carbonea supersparsa.

See also
List of Lecanora species

References

Lichens described in 1810
Lichen species
Lichens of North America
cenisia
Taxa named by Erik Acharius